Lyubov Nikolaevna Tolkalina (born 5 February 1978) is a Russian theater and film actress.

Biography
In 1999 she graduated from the Theatre Faculty of the National Institute of Cinematography (aka VGIK).

From 1999 to 2003 she was an actress at the Theatre of Russian Army. She played Sarah in "Ivanov" by Chekhov (1999) and Desdemona in "Othello" by William Shakespeare (2000).

In 2002 she acquired greater popularity through her role in the action movie "Anti-Killer" and its sequel. She had roles in several television series. She is known outside Russia by her roles in Matroesjka's, a television series on human trafficking, and in the tragi-comedy Ya tebya lyublyu / You I Love from 2004. In this movie by Olga Stolpovskaja and Dmitry Troitsky she played the role of Vera, a woman who is confronted with the homosexual relationship of her friend. The gay and bisexual theme of the movie caused fuss in Russia.

She is married to the Russian director Egor Konchalovsky. They have a daughter, Masha.

Filmography

References

External links
 
 Tolkalina.ru Website (in Russian)
 

1978 births
Living people
Russian film actresses
Russian television actresses
Russian stage actresses
21st-century Russian actresses
Gerasimov Institute of Cinematography alumni